Fonyód is a town and holiday resort on the southern shore of Lake Balaton, in north-west Somogy, western Hungary, with over 4,700 residents. It is the seat of Fonyód District.

History
The first mention of Fonyód was in a letter of Saint Ladislaus from 1082, as the village Funoldi. In 1232, the village was included into the lands of the Tihany Abbey. Maps from the 14th century show Fonyód as an island (with Balaton being larger), with a castle. The castle was occupied and destroyed in 1575 during the Turkish invasion, with no one living in the village by 1580. After the Turkish occupation, Fonyód remained uninhabited until the 19th century.

The construction of a railway around Lake Balaton greatly contributed to the village's development. By 1900, Fonyód had become a holiday resort, and by 1910 over a thousand visitors were arriving each year.

Fonyód attained town status in 1989.

Economy
The town is famous for its mineral water which is bottled there under the name Fonyódi and is owned by the Croatian company, Jana (part of Agrokor).

The electronics producer cms manufacturing (owned by the Austrian cms electronics) and the Italian electronics device producer Datalogic operate factories in the town.

Notable people
 Csilla Molnár (1969–1986), beauty queen
 Ilona Győri (1929–2001), actress
 András Fodor (1929–1997), poet and essayist

Twin towns – sister cities

Fonyód is twinned with:
 Borsec, Romania
 Krotoszyn, Poland
 Leipheim, Germany
 Mettet, Belgium
 Nové Zámky, Slovakia

Gallery

See also
Fonyód–Alsóbélatelep

References

External links

 in Hungarian, English and German
Street map 

Populated places in Somogy County
History of Somogy